Oberonia crateriformis, commonly known as the cratered fairy orchid, is a plant in the orchid family and is a clump-forming epiphyte or lithophyte. It has between four and six leaves in a fan-like arrangement on each shoot and a large number of pale red flowers arranged in whorls of eight around the flowering stem. It is endemic to Queensland.

Description
Oberonia crateriformis is an epiphytic or lithophytic, clump-forming herb. The sepals are turned back towards the ovary. The side lobes spread apart and the middle lobe has a crater-like pit. Flowering occurs between February and June.

Taxonomy and naming
Oberonia crateriformis was first formally described in 2006 by David Jones and Mark Clements who published the description in Australian Orchid Research. The type specimen was grown in the Australian National Botanic Gardens from a plant collected near Eungella. The specific epithet (crateriformis) refers to the bowl-shaped pit on the labellum.

Distribution and habitat
The cratered fairy orchid grows on trees and rocks in rainforest and in other humid, sheltered places. It is widespread and common between Eungella and Mount Misery in Queensland.

References

crateriformis
Endemic orchids of Australia
Plants described in 2006
Orchids of Queensland